Kraborovice is a municipality and village in Havlíčkův Brod District in the Vysočina Region of the Czech Republic. It has about 100 inhabitants.

Administrative parts
The village of Úhrov is an administrative part of Kraborovice.

References

Villages in Havlíčkův Brod District